Gartner, Inc. is a technological research and consulting firm based in Stamford, Connecticut that conducts research on technology and shares this research both through private consulting as well as executive programs and conferences. Its clients include large corporations, government agencies, technology companies, and investment firms.  

In 2018, the company reported that its client base consisted of over 12,000 organizations in over 100 countries. As of 2022, Gartner has over 15,000 employees located in over 100 offices worldwide. It is a member of the S&P 500.

History
Gideon Gartner founded Gartner, Inc in 1979. Originally private, the company launched publicly as Gartner Group in 1986 before Saatchi & Saatchi acquired it in 1988.

In 1990, Gartner Group was acquired by some of its executives, including Gartner himself, with funding from Bain Capital and Dun & Bradstreet. The company went public again in 1993. In 2000, the name was simplified from Gartner Group to Gartner.

In 2000, Gartner coined the term Supranet. Gene Hall has been the CEO of the company since August 2004.

In the course of its growth, Gartner has acquired numerous companies providing related services, including Real Decisions—which became Gartner Measurement, now part of Gartner's consulting division—and Gartner Dataquest, a market research firm. It has also acquired a number of direct competitors, Meta Group in 2005, AMR Research and Burton Group in early 2010, and Ideas International in 2012.

In March 2014, Gartner announced that it had acquired the privately held company Software Advice for an undisclosed amount. 

In 2014, Gartner also coined the term "Digital BizOps" and further developed the early philosophy for digital business operations. In July 2015, Gartner acquired Nubera, the business app discovery network that owns properties like GetApp (a peer review site), AppStorm, AppAppeal, and CloudWork. Terms of the deal were not disclosed. In September 2015, it acquired the privately held peer review site (PRS) Capterra.

In June 2016, Gartner announced that it had acquired the privately held company SCM World, headquartered in London, U.K. On January 5, 2017 Gartner announced it had reached an agreement to acquire CEB, Inc. in a cash and stock deal worth about US$2.6 billion. On March 7, 2017 Gartner announced that it has agreed to buy New York–based L2 Inc, which specialises in benchmarking the digital performance of brands. Terms of the deal were not disclosed.

See also

 Gartner hype cycle, a graphical presentation developed by Gartner
 Magic Quadrant, a market research report type published by Gartner
 SoundView Technology Group, founded as a financial service for Gartner

References

External links
 

Companies listed on the New York Stock Exchange
Consulting firms established in 1979
International information technology consulting firms
Research and analysis firms of the United States
Companies based in Stamford, Connecticut
1993 initial public offerings
Futures studies organizations